Renae Kunst is an Australian international rugby league player.

References 

1982 births
Living people
Australia women's national rugby league team players
Australian female rugby league players
Rugby league players from Mackay, Queensland
Rugby league second-rows